The Sociedad de Foot-Ball de Barcelona was a football scratch team that existed between 1892 and 1896, mainly consisting of players from the British colony of Barcelona, but also with Catalans and even Frenchmen. This entity was initially known as the Barcelona Football Club (1892–94), before being renamed as Sociedad de Foot-Ball de Barcelona following a restructuring in 1894. It was one of the first Catalan football clubs and is considered a predecessor of FC Barcelona founded in 1899.  Some historians ascribe this entity as "a group of thirty friends, English workers, who played alternately and without a regular squad".

This entity is best remembered for its pioneering role in the amateur beginnings of football in Catalonia, organizing the first known football match in Barcelona in 1892 and being the catalyst for many other historic landmarks such as the oldest photograph of a football team in Spain and the first proper chronicle of a football match in Spain, both regarding a game between the club's members held on 12 March 1893. Moreover, they were part of the first known rivalry in Spanish football, when they faced the Scottish colony of Sant Martí a few times during the winter of 1893–94. Their game against a team from Torelló in 1895 marked the first time that teams from two different cities played against each other in Catalonia.

In 1895, the presidency of this club was given to the British consul William Wyndham. Apart from Wyndham as president, little is known about its board of directors, only that James Reeves, English, and George Cockram, Scottish, were its captain and vice-captain respectively between 1892 and 1894, always acting as captains on the two sides into which the members of the club were divided every Sunday. Reeves was the undisputed leader and fundamental head behind the club's foundation and management, and likewise, upon his departure in the autumn of 1895, this society, which was never officially established, soon declined and seems to disappear around 1896.

Between 1892 and 1895, this group of football pioneers would meet up in a field near the Hippodrome of Can Tunis, and from 1895 onwards, the club's meetings were held at the Velódromo de la Bonanova, because it was closer to the city center, thus practicing the sport before the attentive and curious gaze of the local population.

History

Origins
At the end of the 19th century, Catalonia enjoyed the most developed industry in Spain, especially thanks to its cotton industry, and for this reason, Barcelona became the home to a vast British colony. Football first entered Catalonia thanks to the British colony that worked and lived there (and later through the Catalans returning from studying abroad), among whom a certain James Reeves stood out. He arrived in Barcelona at some point in early 1892, a time when football was a sport practically unknown in the city. The Barcelona Cricket Club domiciled at Ronda de Sant Pere, founded by Britons a year earlier, was the only sign of football in Catalonia, as they played cricket in the summer and then football in the winter (which was common at the time). The Cricket Club was one of the many branches of the British Club de Barcelona, located on La Rambla dels Capuchins, and it was under the umbrella of the British Club that these cricket players began meeting in Can Tunis in a field located between the hippodrome and the Civil Arsenal, playing their first cricket matches there, which were disputed not only between the club's members, but also against British sailors who docked in the port of Barcelona on some occasions, with the earliest example of this dating back to 28 August 1891. However, they were a strictly British entity, so instead of joining their cricket team, Reeves, an enthusiastic and passionate lover of football, decided to create his own club that would include British and Catalans alike.

Reeves was a member of Club Regatas de Barcelona (a club of rowing and sailing established in 1881), and the spokesman for the club's British members (or British Club Regatas), so he meets and convinces some of its members to practice football, recruiting Britons, Catalans and even some Frenchmen. They began to play football in the field near the Can Tunis hippodrome around the winter of 1892. The cricket team of the British Club was thus soon accompanied by enthusiastic Barcelona residents, mostly members of the Barcelona Regatas Club, and naturally, these two groups began facing each other. And in fact, on 18 November 1919, Agustin Peris de Vargas, another pioneer of football in Catalonia, published in El Figaró that “The first football "match" of which I have news took place in the Hipódromo de Barcelona (Can Tunis), ​​in 1892, between young people from the English colony, who belonged to a Society, domiciled in the round of San Pedro, called "Cricket Club Barcelona", and between some nationals.” Said nationals were the Catalans of the Regatas Club and said match was probably held in the winter months of November and December 1892. The players, no matter the number (they rarely managed to be 22), were divided into two teams, one dressed in Blue (Azul) and their opponents in Red (Encarnado). The matches were preferably held on holidays since until 1905, Sunday was not a non-working day.

Also on the grounds near the Hippodrome of Can Tunis, James Morris Campbell, an English entrepreneur and engineer who moved to Barcelona in 1889–90 to run the Barcelona Tramways Company Limited, taught his three sons, Samuel, Enrique (Henry) and Miguel (Júnior), the practice of football, a sport which at the time was practically unknown in the city. Known in Catalonia as Jaime Morris, he was a member of the British Club of Barcelona and founder of the Barcelona Cricket Club, a sport he also practiced. His three sons were members of the cricket team and they took part in the first football matches organized in Barcelona, and together with Reeves, they were crucial in its success.

After some football games at Can Tunis, Reeves convinces some of the Cricket Club members to join him as well, impressing some of his countrymen with his enthusiastic, passionate and entrepreneurial spirit, thus achieving a respectable number of partners in a short period of time. Among those cricketers that he convinced were the Morris brothers, and together with them, along with the others he recruited, they founded a new club unaffiliated from the British Club of La Rambla, which had been founded, among others, by the father of the Morris. Apparently, this group of football pioneers led by Reeves never had an actual name, however, it has been branded as the Barcelona Football Club (with the English spelling), maybe to avoid confusion with the Futbol Club Barcelona founded in 1899.

Barcelona Football Club (1892–94)
Despite the British colony of Barcelona having a large presence in the city, finding 22 individuals (plus the referee) was not an easy task, given that the expatriates came to work and many of them had positions of responsibility. It was not until the end of 1892 (the winter) when Reeves managed to gather enough individuals to assemble two teams (plus the referee), although in the vast majority of matches they did not complete the 11 per side. This group of football pioneers was made up of the British cricket players of the Barcelona Cricket Club, such as the Morris brothers, Henry Wood, Dumsday, Richardson, Beaty-Pownall and MacAndrews; the British, Catalan and French members of the Club Regatas de Barcelona, such as Park, Noble; Barrié, Chofre, Figueras, Tuñi and Serra; Daunt and Georges Dagnière; and some other figures from unknown whereabouts such as George Cockram and Henry W. Brown. Finally, on 25 December 1892, they were able to play the first known football match in the city (actually in the neighboring municipality of Sants), which was held in some field between the Hippodrome of Can Tunis and the civil arsenal. On the Christmas Eve, the local newspaper La Dinastía reported the following about this match: "The partners from the Real Club de Regatas have organized a game of foot-ball, which they will play at eight in the morning on Sunday(25)". Josep Elias i Juncosa, who played for FC Barcelona between 1900 and 1903, recalled having witnessed matches at the Can Tunis Hippodrome between the English and the members of the Club de Regatas: “A whole team from the Club de Regatas –then the most important athletic society among us– arrived by sea, in a canoe, to deal with the English, with whom they played for three months”. And in fact, Reeves kept organizing football games among members of his club de Barcelona (partners of Club Regatas and British Club) between December 1892 and March 1893, with the last game of the season taking place on 12 March (at the time, football was an autumn-winter sport).

The match of 12 March 1893 between a Blue and a Red team was a historic one in many ways. In addition to being the last game of the season, this match was the subject of the first proper chronicle of the dispute of a football match, which appeared in La Dinastía on 16 March 1893, written by Enrique Font Valencia, who detailed the aspects of the game, including lineups, the color of the clothes, the name of the referee, the result and the goalscorers. According to the chronicle, the match took place at four in the afternoon, on the field near the Hippodrome of Can Tunis, and it concludes by assuring that they will start a football team in the next year. The blue team “was captained by Mr. Cochran (Cockram), Lockie, as guard; Wood and Chofre, as rear guard; Barrié, Park and Higgins forming the avant-garde half; and P. Noble, Bell, H. Morris, and Figueras the vanguard. Among the incarnations (reds), which was captained by Mr. Reewes (Reeves), S. Morris, was the guard; the rear guard was made up of MacAndrews and Tuñi; the middle vanguard by Dumsday, Brown, Richardson, and the vanguard by Beaty-Pownatt (Pownall), Serra, Daunt and Dagniere. Mr. Collett acted as field judge”. The blue team won 2–1 with goals from Figueras and Barrié, while the red's one was netted by Mr. Reeves himself, who saw his club's inclusion of Catalans paying off since both Blue goals were scored by Catalans.

Years later, specifically on 6 January 1906, Joaquim Escardó of Los Deportes published a picture of the 22 footballers that played that match, plus the referee and a young boy who watched from the stands, Miguel Morris, the younger brother of Samuel (standing, second from the left) and Enrique (wearing a beret). The caption names all the figures and even though Escardó did not date it exactly (“The two sides of the then-existing Barcelona Football Club formed around the years from 1892 to 1895…”), the coincidence of the players and referee suggests that this engraving corresponds to the match played on 12 March. The image is thus widely believed to be the oldest photograph of a football team in Spain and has been suggested to be the team of a Methodist church in Barcelona, which is not true, since most of them are Catholic. The 1906 article also stated that "The individual from the English colony Reewes was the soul of that Club".

After the summer of 1893, football returned to the Catalan capital, and between the winter months of December 1893 and April 1894, the news in the Barcelona press related several matches between the English Colony from Barcelona and the Scottish colony from Sant Martí, with the press reporting at least three matches between them, played on 8 December 1893, 11 March, and 15 April 1894. Local historians claim that this was the first ever 'unofficial' rivalry in Spanish football. The Scottish colony's history began in 1893, when John Shields and Edward B. Steegmann rented the central warehouses of a factory in Sant Martí, to create a branch of Johnston, Shields & Co in Catalonia, which become known as La Escocesa. These Scottish workers would later create Escocès FC, and likewise, the English Colony went on to create Team Anglès, two teams who were pivotal in the history of Catalan football.

Sociedad de Foot-Ball de Barcelona (1894–96)

The heat of the summer of 1894 gave rise to a conflict between the club's members, which caused the entity to split into two groups, one led by Reeves and the other by Cockram and William MacAndrews, which led to the creation of two separate teams, with Reeves's side becoming known as Sociedad de Foot-Ball de Barcelona in mid-autumn. Both sides suffered from an immediate lack of players, so Reeves turned to Club Regatas again, recruiting Tordo, Soñé and Codina, and then turns to the Barcelona Cricket Club as well, recruiting new British members such as Quiney, Fallon, Heather, and most notably, another pioneering pair of brothers, the Parsons, John and William. On the other hand, Cockram's group decides to move and settle in the neighboring town of Sant Vicenç de Torelló in Osona, emerged where they introduced football to the Colonia Borgonyà from the Scottish spinning company J& P Coats Ltd. and thus the Torelló Foot-ball Association was born, for the entertainment of their workers.

Together with the change of names, came also the change of fields, as the Barcelona club left the Hippodrome of Can Tunis, where they had been playing football, and moved to the Velódromo de la Bonanova, as they were looking for a place of easier access to the city center. The first football match played in Bonanova took place on 27 January 1895 and was played by 16 players from the Barcelona Football Society divided into two teams: one dressed in blue and the other one in red. From then on, Sunday football games became a regular event at Bonanova, although its vast majority were training matches (Blues vs Reds), such as the one held on 2 February 1895, in which the Blues, captained by Reeves, played with ten men against the eleven of the Reds, captained by Beaty-Pownall, and it was the extra man who made the difference as the Reds won 4–1 in a game that saw both captains score once, while John Parsons (2) and Phillips netted the other three. Also in early February 1895, this group of football pioneers offered the honorary presidency of their society to the British consul William Wyndham, which he accepted; surely a detail that highlights that this entity was, at least, a serious and very well organized group, but despite that, there is no evidence of ever being legally established. The Barcelona Football Society had its headquarters next to the Bonanova velodrome, being uniformed with a red shirt and white pants.

The activity of the Barcelona society continued with intensity and news give reports of several training sessions to prepare for future matches against the Torelló team. Barcelona only played two non-training matches in the 1894–95 season, both against Cockram's Torelló team, with Reeves being the captain in both games. The first match took place on 24 March 1895 and ended in an 8–3 local victory, and the result was attributed to the fact that Torelló played against the sun and against the wind and that their five forwards (or runners as the local press of the time called them) had trouble getting through Barcelona's strong and robust defenders, Brown and Wilson. Barcelona's goals were netted by Reeves, John (2) and William Parsons, Enrique Morris, Barrié, Fallon and Beaty-Pownall, while Torelló's goals were scored by Cockram, Englis and Tong. The second match took place on 14 April, after the Torelló Football Association, fulfilling a duty of courtesy, accepted the invitation of the Barcelona Football Society to play another match, this one at Torelló's field, a sloping and flooded ground. According to the chronicles of the time, they disputed said "challenge" as an act of revenge, and this time victory smiled at those from Torelló with a 5–3 win. Barcelona played with the same team except for three changes, replacing defenders Fallon and Wilson with Richardson and Quiney, and midfielder Barrié with Heather. On the other hand, Torelló played with only one change. Cockram netted a hat-trick in the first half to give a 3–0 lead to his side, but Barcelona fought back in the second half and managed to make it 3–3. However, Torelló scored twice in the dying minutes, thanks to an own goal and pressure on Barça's defender Quiney that forced him to drop the ball for an unidentified Torelló element to score. These meetings gave rise to the curious circumstance that a peseta was charged for the entrance and 2.10 with a seat in the grandstand. With a capacity of 3,000, Bonanova was seen completely full on both occasions as the public wanted to witness the very first football games between teams from two different cities (in Catalonia), being interested in the affair as if it was well known to most of them, and after the games were over, the attendees left the venue enthusiastic and satisfied, and with some of the young spectators dedicating themselves to rehearsing some passes and hits with the ball, thus demonstrating the pleasure with which they had witnessed it.

In the spring of 1895, football in Barcelona was already played by several junior and senior teams, and the winning teams were awarded medals. There are already many Catalans in these teams: G. Busquets, J. Busquets, Serra, Puiggener, Arcola, Tordo, Suñé, Batlle, Soler, Farré, Montañés, Ramírez, Molera, Cerdá, Codina or Arancitia. But despite this strength, the club's many problems with the owners of the velodrome complicated the existence of the company, which had to look for another course.

Decline and collapse
Coinciding with the closure of the Barcelona Waterworks Company Ltd, James Reeves returned to the United Kingdom in the autumn of 1895, leaving the club orphaned in its 
management. Following the departure of the "club's soul", it was the Catalans who took the reins of the team, but without him, the entity soon began to decline, and by early 1896 he was a shadow of himself. In view of the difficulties encountered by the concession of the premises of the Bonanova Velodrome, they began to play between the vicinity of the velodrome and the streets and esplanades of San Gervasi, before moving back to the field near Casa Antúnez (Can Tunis). Around 1896 this society, which was never officially established, seems to disappear as news about the Barcelona Football Society become non-existent and Torelló followed them to the grave.

However, it is known that many of the players of the Barcelona and Torelló societies continued to practice football through other societies such as the Fomento del Sport Velocipédico (Barcelona Velocipedistas Society), the company that managed the installation of the Bonanova velodrome, which decided to encourage and continue to organize football games and other typically English Sports, but such arrangements also seem to be gone by the end of 1896. The Catalan members of the Barcelona Football Society, most of whom being part of Real Club de Regatas, also continued to organize football games, especially against a local team known as the Faculty of Sciences, facing each other at the grounds near Casa Antúnez. The lines-ups of both teams were all made of Catalans except one of the Parsons brothers, and some of them were veterans of the Barcelona Society, such as Alberto Serra. For this reason, no Briton played football in Catalonia (sept for the Parsons) in 1897 and 1898. Football in the city then crosses its first crisis, a period of lack of interest in football that lasted three years (1896–99), with only the Faculty of Sciences and the cycling fans of the Velocipédico Club continuing to play sporadically.

Legacy
The British Colony of Barcelona only began to play again in 1899, with the emergence of Team Anglès and FC Barcelona. The Parsons brothers, John and William, played a vital role in the return of football to the Catalan capital, as they were involved in the foundation of both teams. The Morris brothers and Henry W. Brown also played for Team Anglès. These two sides merged on 13 December 1899, just two weeks after Barça was founded, which meant a big leap in quality for the club, and as a result, Barcelona become one of the strongest teams in Catalonia at the turn of the century. Some of the British players that joined Barça were prominent figures in the club's early success, such as the Parsons and the Morris brothers, and also the Witty brothers (Arthur and Ernest). Some of these figures even become part of Barça's board of directors with John Parsons becoming the vice-president of the club while his brother William was appointed as the new vice-captain of the team behind Joan Gamper. This entity, which like its predecessors was also never officially established, seems to disappear around 1900, and never to be reformed again, but despite its very short life, the football teams of the English Colony of Barcelona left a big mark in the history of Catalan football.

Notable players
 James Reeves: Founder and Captain. The undisputed leader and main driving force behind the foundations of the original entity and Sociedad de Foot-Ball de Barcelona.
 Samuel Morris: Originally from the Barcelona Cricket Club, he played several friendly matches with them at the Hippodrome of Can Tunis and a few others at the Velódromo de la Bonanova between 1892 and 1896, where he stood out as a great scorer, but he later moved on to play as a goalkeeper. 
 Enrique Morris: Originally from the Barcelona Cricket Club, he was part of this entity from 1892 to 1896 as a forward, netting once in an 8–3 victory over Torelló. He was later a winner of the 1900–01 Copa Macaya with Hispania AC, the first-ever official title in Spanish football. 
 Miguel Morris: The youngest of the Morris brothers, he is the boy who appears in the 1893 photograph of the two sides of the Barcelona Football Club. 
 John and William Parsons: Originally from the Barcelona Cricket Club, but they only joined in 1895. John scored twice for the Reds in a match in 1895 and twice again in an 8–3 victory over Torelló, with William also scoring on the latter. They went on to be co-founders of FC Barcelona.
 Alberto Serra: Originally from Club Regatas, he was part of this entity from 1892 to 1896 as a forward. He later became the first to write a chronicle of a FC Barcelona match.
 John Beaty-Pownall: Originally from the Barcelona Cricket Club, he was part of this entity from 1892 to 1896 as a forward. He captained the Red team in 1895 and netted three goals against Torelló in 1895, one in an 8–3 home win and a brace in a 3–5 loss.
 William MacAndrews: Originally from the Barcelona Cricket Club, he was one of the main figures of this entity between 1892 and 1894, where he stood out as a great scorer, although he played in the infamous match of 12 March 1893 as a defender. He later founded the Torelló Football Association.
 George Cockram: He was one of the main figures of this entity between 1892 and 1894, captaining the Blue team in the infamous match of 12 March 1893, and later founding the Torelló Football Association and scoring in both games that Torelló played in 1895, a consolation goal in an 8–3 away loss and a first-half hat-trick in a 5–3 home victory over Barcelona.
 Henry Wood: Originally from the Barcelona Cricket Club, he was one of the main figures of this entity between 1892 and 1894, where he stood out as a great defender. He later founded the Torelló Football Association.
 Henry W. Brown: He was part of this entity from 1892 to 1896, playing as a midfielder. He played for the Red Team in the infamous match of 12 March 1893. Together with the Parsons, he was one of the few players who was part of both the Barcelona Society of 1894–96 and FC Barcelona.
 Barrié: Originally from Club Regatas, he was part of this entity from 1892 to 1896 as a forward, netting a goal for the Blue team in the infamous match of 12 March 1893, and another on Barça's 8–3 victory over Torelló.

Squad
Source:

Note: Only those who played for the Sociedad de Foot-Ball de Barcelona (1894–96). In total 21 Britons (including the Parsons brothers, born in Barcelona, ​​and the Morris brothers, born in the Philippines, as well as the Irish international Wilson), 2 Frenchmen (Georges Dagnière and Barrié) and 7 Catalans.

Results

See also
Football in Catalonia

References

Defunct football clubs in Catalonia
Association football clubs established in 1892
Association football clubs disestablished in 1896
1892 establishments in Spain
1896 disestablishments in Spain
Football clubs in Barcelona